Guy Ferre may refer to:

Guy Ferre the Elder (died. c. 1302)
Guy Ferre the Younger (died 1323)